Across The Years is a series of timed multi-day ultra-marathons held from December 28 to January 1 each year outside Phoenix, Arizona. It consists of a 24-hour race, a 48-hour race, a 72-hour race and a 6-day race. The 6-day race was reintroduced for the 2013–2014 edition.

All races are held on a 1.05 mile loop at Camelback Ranch in Glendale, AZ. The 6-day race begins on December 28 and ends on January 3. The 72-hour race starts at 9am on December 29 and ends at 9am on January 1. The 24-hour race is held in three sessions, one each day during the 72-hour race, from 9am to 9am. The 48-hour race is likewise held in two sessions, overlapping on the second day.

This race has become very popular in recent years and as a result, until 2010, hopeful participants must have been picked in a lottery to have an opportunity to participate. However, due to the increased capacity at Camelback Ranch, in 2011 the lottery was removed and registration was once again offered to all on a first-come, first-served basis.

Founded in 1983 by Harold Sieglaff, the race has changed over the years in location as well as organization. In its first year, 6- and 12-hour races were offered. In the 1999–2000 event, a 6-day race was offered and reintroduced in 2013–2014. Until 1993 the race was held at Washington High School in Phoenix, after which it was moved to different locations, including a 500-meter certified loop at Nardini Manor in Buckeye, AZ from 2003 until 2010. It has been held at Camelback Ranch in Glendale, AZ from 2011 onwards.

Race Records

External links
Across The Years
Multiday and Ultrarunning news
ULTRAmarathonRunning.com Global Ultramarathon Races & Events Calendar

Multiday races
Ultramarathons in the United States
1983 establishments in Arizona
Recurring sporting events established in 1983
Sports competitions in Phoenix, Arizona
Sports in Glendale, Arizona
Events in Glendale, Arizona